Earl Clinton "Hap" Collard (August 29, 1898 – July 9, 1968) was a Major League Baseball pitcher who played for three seasons. He played for the Cleveland Indians from 1927 to 1928 and the Philadelphia Phillies in 1930.

External links

1898 births
1968 deaths
Cleveland Indians players
Philadelphia Phillies players
Major League Baseball pitchers
Baseball players from Arizona
People from Williams, Arizona